Kaalam Kaathu Ninnilla is a 1979 Indian Malayalam film,  directed by A. B. Raj and produced by T. K. Balachandran. The film stars Prem Nazir, Jayabharathi and Sankaradi in the lead roles. The film has musical score by A. T. Ummer.

Cast
Prem Nazir
Jayabharathi
Sankaradi
Priya
Sreelatha Namboothiri
Raghavan
Poojappura Ravi
Oduvil Unnikrishnan
Vanchiyoor Radha

Soundtrack
The music was composed by A. T. Ummer and the lyrics were written by Mankombu Gopalakrishnan and Chirayinkeezhu Ramakrishnan Nair.

References

External links
 

1979 films
1970s Malayalam-language films